Kubukasthali  is a village development committee in Ramechhap District in the Janakpur Zone of north-eastern Nepal. At the time of the 1991 Nepal census it had a population of 3,231 people living in 603 individual households.

References

External links
UN map of the municipalities of Ramechhap District

Populated places in Ramechhap District